Måns Jakob Setterberg, (born 22 July 1974) is a Swedish actor, television presenter and comedian. He made his film debut in the Jan Troells film Ingenjör Andrées luftfärd in 1982. He is also a member of the comedy group Grotesco, he has also been part of the comedy show Partaj broadcast on Kanal5. Since 2010, Setterberg has presented the Vi i femman competition show on SVT.
 
He was married to Grotesco member Emma Molin, the couple divorced in 2020. They have two children together.

References

External links

Swedish comedians
Male actors from Stockholm
1974 births
Living people